George Cătălin Buliga (born 26 April 1998) is a Romanian professional footballer who plays as a centre back and a centre midfielder for CS Afumați.

Club career

Voluntari
Buliga played his first game in Liga I in 2020, in a 3–3 draw against Academica Clinceni.

References

External links
 
 George Buliga at lpf.ro

1998 births
Living people
Footballers from Bucharest
Romanian footballers
Association football defenders
FC Voluntari players
Liga I players
Liga II players
Liga III players
FC Astra Giurgiu players
CS Afumați players